The 2020 Appalachian State Mountaineers football team represented Appalachian State University during the 2020 NCAA Division I FBS football season. The Mountaineers were led by first-year head coach Shawn Clark. Appalachian State played their home games at Kidd Brewer Stadium on the school's Boone, North Carolina, campus, and competed as a member of the East Division of the Sun Belt Conference.

Previous season
The Mountaineers finished the 2019 season 13–1, 7–1 in Sun Belt play to finish in first place in the East Division for the second consecutive year in the Sun Belt Conference. The Mountaineers then played in the Sun Belt Conference Championship Game, beating Louisiana 45–38 where named Sun Belt Conference Champions for the second consecutive year as well. The Mountaineers, finishing first overall in the Sun Belt, were invited to play in the New Orleans Bowl, their second consecutive time taking part in the annual New Orleans, Louisiana bowl game. They played UAB and won their eighth overall bowl game by the score of 31–17.  For the first ever, the Mountaineers were ranked for seven weeks in the AP poll, eight in the Coaches poll, and five in the CFP poll. They finished the season ranked 19th in the AP and 18th in the Coaches.

2020 NFL Draft

Schedule
Appalachian State had games scheduled against Morgan State, UMass, Wake Forest and Wisconsin, which were canceled due to the COVID-19 pandemic.

Schedule Source:

Game summaries

Charlotte

at Marshall

Campbell

Arkansas State

at Louisiana–Monroe

at Texas State

Georgia State

at Coastal Carolina

Troy

Louisiana

at Georgia Southern

vs. North Texas (Myrtle Beach Bowl)

Rankings

Players drafted into the NFL

References

Appalachian State
Appalachian State Mountaineers football seasons
Myrtle Beach Bowl champion seasons
Appalachian State Mountaineers football